Sam Brown Memorial State Wayside is a historical park in Browns Valley, Minnesota, United States, established in 1929 to honor frontiersman Sam Brown (1845–1925).  On April 19, 1866, Brown rode  to warn other settlers of an impending attack by Native Americans, and when the threat proved false he rode back through a spring blizzard to intercept his dispatch to the U.S. Army, suffering injuries that left him in a wheelchair for the rest of his life.

The park named for Brown includes a log building originally constructed in 1864 at Fort Wadsworth in what is now South Dakota and later moved to Browns Valley by town founder Joseph R. Brown, Sam's father.  The Browns used the building as a residence and place of business.  It was listed on the National Register of Historic Places in 1986 as the Fort Wadsworth Agency and Scout Headquarters Building for having local significance in the themes of architecture, exploration/settlement, and military history.  It was nominated for being the only surviving log building of Fort Wadsworth, for its association with the noted father-and-son frontier figures, and as a rare example of post-and-plank construction.

See also
 List of Minnesota state parks
 National Register of Historic Places listings in Traverse County, Minnesota

References

External links
 State Park Waysides

1929 establishments in Minnesota
Buildings and structures in Traverse County, Minnesota
Government buildings on the National Register of Historic Places in Minnesota
Monuments and memorials in Minnesota
Protected areas established in 1929
National Register of Historic Places in Traverse County, Minnesota
Tourist attractions in Traverse County, Minnesota
Log buildings and structures on the National Register of Historic Places in Minnesota
State parks of Minnesota